The 11th British Independent Film Awards, held on 30 November 2008 at the Old Billingsgate Market in London, honoured the best British independent films of 2008.

Awards
The winner is bolded at the top of each section.

Best British Independent Film
 Slumdog Millionaire 
 Hunger
 In Bruges
 Man on Wire
 Somers Town

Best Director
 Danny Boyle for Slumdog Millionaire
 Steve McQueen for Hunger Shane Meadows for Somers Town Garth Jennings for Son of Rambow Mark Herman for The Boy in the Striped PajamasThe Douglas Hickox Award
Given to a British director on their debut feature
 Steve McQueen for Hunger James Watkins for Eden Lake Martin McDonagh for In Bruges Eran Creevy for Shifty Rupert Wyatt for The EscapistBest Actor
 Michael Fassbender for Hunger Brendan Gleeson for In Bruges Colin Farrell for In Bruges Riz Ahmed for Shifty Thomas Turgoose for Somers TownBest Actress
 Vera Farmiga for The Boy in the Striped Pyjamas Kelly Reilly for Eden Lake Sally Hawkins for Happy-Go-Lucky Samantha Morton for The Daisy Chain Keira Knightley for The DuchessBest Supporting Actor
 Eddie Marsan for Happy-Go-Lucky Liam Cunningham for Hunger Ralph Fiennes for In Bruges Daniel Mays for Shifty Ralph Fiennes for The DuchessBest Supporting Actress
 Alexis Zegerman for Happy-Go-Lucky Emma Thompson for Brideshead Revisited Kristin Scott Thomas for Easy Virtue Hayley Atwell for The Duchess Sienna Miller for The Edge of Love 
Best Screenplay
 Martin McDonagh for In Bruges Steve McQueen and Enda Walsh for Hunger Simon Beaufoy for Slumdog Millionaire Paul Fraser for Somers Town Garth Jennings for Son of RambowMost Promising Newcomer
 Dev Patel for Slumdog Millionaire Ayush Mahesh Khedekar for Slumdog Millionaire Bill Milner for Son of Rambow Will Poulter for Son of Rambow Asa Butterfield for The Boy in the Striped PyjamasBest Achievement In Production
 The Escapist Hush Shifty Telstar The Daisy ChainBest Technical Achievement
 Sean Bobbitt for Hunger Jon Gregory for In Bruges Harry Escott and Molly Nyman for Shifty Anthony Dod Mantle for Slumdog Millionaire Michael O'Connor for The Duchess Best British Documentary 
 Man on Wire A Complete History of My Sexual Failures Derek Of Time and the City Three Miles North of MolkomBest British Short
 Soft Alex and her Arse Truck Gone Fishing Love Does Grow on Trees Red Sands (documentary)Best Foreign Film
 Waltz with Bashir (Israel/Germany/France) Gomorrah
 I've Loved You So Long
 Persepolis
 The Diving Bell and the Butterfly

Raindance Award
 Zebra Crossings Clubbed Flick One Day Removals''

The Richard Harris Award
 David Thewlis

The Variety Award
 Michael Sheen

The Special Jury Prize
 Joe Dunton

References

British Independent Film Awards
2008 film awards
Independent Film Awards
2008 in London
November 2008 events in the United Kingdom